Phillip King may refer to:
 Phillip King (sculptor) (1934–2021), British sculptor
 Phillip Parker King (1791–1856), maritime and explorer and surveyor of Australia
 Phillip King (tennis) (born 1981), American tennis player

See also
 Philip King (disambiguation)